The 1976 FA Cup final was the 95th final of the FA Cup. It took place on 1 May 1976 at Wembley Stadium and was contested between Manchester United and Southampton.

United had finished third in the First Division that season, and were strong favourites, while unfancied Southampton had finished sixth in the Second Division, Southampton had more players with FA Cup Final experience than Manchester United, namely Jim McCalliog (1966), Peter Rodrigues (1969) and Peter Osgood (1970). In one of the biggest shocks in the history of the final, Southampton won 1–0 through an 83rd-minute goal from Bobby Stokes. It was the first time Southampton won a major trophy, and the last time that Elizabeth II attended a final and presented the trophy to the winners.

Road to Wembley

Match summary
Manchester United started stronger, and missed several early goalscoring opportunities, with Southampton goalkeeper Ian Turner making a series of impressive saves to deny Gerry Daly and Gordon Hill. Southampton in turn began to create chances; Mick Channon was put through on goal before being denied by goalkeeper Alex Stepney. As extra time loomed, Southampton's Bobby Stokes received Jim McCalliog's pass and slotted the ball across Stepney and into the far corner to score a late winner and with it his side's first major trophy.

Match details

In popular culture
Jasper Carrott immortalised the match in his song "Cup Final '76", which appeared on the album Carrott In Notts.

References

Print

Internet

External links
Game facts at soccerbase.com

Final
FA Cup Finals
Fa Cup Final 1976
Fa Cup Final 1976
FA Cup Final
FA Cup Final